Israel Whelen (1752-1806) was a prosperous Pennsylvania merchant and government agent.

Whelen was born into a family of Quakers, yet he joined the Patriot movement and raised a company of Associators which he commanded in the field; subsequently being disowned by the Society of Friends, he insisted it was right to oppose "lawless tyranny." He served as a commissioner and financial agent for Congress in 1776, for signing Continental currency banknotes. Whelen later moved to Philadelphia where he started a grocery business. In 1794 he joined forces with Joseph Miller; their partnership soon expanded into shipping and at the end of the century also into an active trade in gunpowder with Revolutionary France, in spite of Whelen being a Federalist state senator.
 
As state senator Whelen sat on a committee to secure ratification of the Jay Treaty, and was also a member of the electoral college for Pennsylvania when 14 of 15 electors cast their ballots for Thomas Jefferson. He became United States commissioner of assessed taxes for the District of Pennsylvania, in charge of collecting all federal revenues in the state. Whelen was American agent of the Phoenix Insurance Company of London, one of the first members of the Philadelphia Stock Exchange when it was founded in 1790, a Director of the Bank of the United States when it was founded in 1791, and president of the Lancaster Turnpike Company. In 1800, Whelen was appointed purveyor of public supplies; an office he led until 1803. He was, as "Agent for the removal of the Public Departments" in charge of physically moving the government from Philadelphia to Washington, D.C.

As a merchant, Whelen amassed  substantial assets and he built an impressive home near Downingtown. Yet, shortly before his death he suffered significant losses when the French government under Napoleon seized a number of his ships.

Legacy
The Defense Logistics Agency Troop Support Headquarters in Philadelphia is dedicated in honor of Israel Whelen.

References

1752 births
1806 deaths
Pennsylvania state senators
People from Chester County, Pennsylvania
18th-century United States government officials
19th-century United States government officials
United States Purveyor of Public Supplies